The Thorn Birds is an American television miniseries broadcast on ABC from March 27 to 30, 1983. It starred Richard Chamberlain, Rachel Ward, Barbara Stanwyck, Christopher Plummer, Piper Laurie, Jean Simmons, Richard Kiley, Bryan Brown, Mare Winningham and Philip Anglim. It was directed by Daryl Duke and based on the 1977 novel of the same name by Colleen McCullough. The series was enormously successful and became the United States' second highest-rated miniseries of all time behind Roots; both series were produced by television veteran David L. Wolper.

Plot

Cast

Development
The novel was originally developed as a feature film with Ed Lewis attached to produce. Ivan Moffat wrote an early draft of the script. Herbert Ross was the first director, and he saw Christopher Reeve about playing the lead. Then Peter Weir became attached to direct; Robert Redford was the favourite to play the lead. Eventually Weir dropped out and Arthur Hiller was going to direct; Ryan O'Neal was mooted as a star. Eventually it was decided to turn it into a mini series.

The role of Meggie Cleary became the most sought after role of the production, and was considered the role of a lifetime. Many actresses campaigned and auditioned for the role over a long period of pre-production. British actress Lynne Frederick was one of many actresses who heavily campaigned for the role. Frederick even dyed her hair red to showcase herself. Other actresses who auditioned for the part included Michelle Pfeiffer, Jane Seymour, Olivia Newton-John, and Kim Basinger.

Filming
 Although the mini-series is set in Australia, it was filmed in the United States. The outback scenes were filmed in southern California and the Queensland scenes were filmed on the Hawaiian island of Kauai.  The Drogheda main house was a set built on the Big Sky Ranch in Simi Valley, California. The train station was depicted by the Santa Paula Depot in Santa Paula.
 The mountainous terrain of the southern California "outback" filming location does not resemble western New South Wales, which is predominantly level to gently rolling.
 The mini-series included "the most dangerous bus in Australia". Since filming took place in the US an American bus was used. In Australia, which drives on the left side of the road, its passengers would have to board and be set down in the middle of the road.
 In the miniseries, Drogheda, Mary Carson's sheep station, is said to have been named after the Irish town of Drogheda, by a former resident of that town. However, it is mispronounced by all characters as "Druh-GHEE-duh". In fact, the Irish "gh" is pronounced like the "ch" in "Loch" and the stress is on the first syllable, meaning that the station would be pronounced as "DROCH-e-duh".
 Rachel Ward, who was born in 1957, plays the mother of a daughter played by 1959-born actress Mare Winningham, and a son played by 1952-born actor Philip Anglim.
 Rachel Ward met her husband Bryan Brown on the set while filming the series. Brown plays Luke O'Neill, who marries Ward's character, Meggie Cleary.
 Actor Bryan Brown was the only Australian-born cast member hired in a major role. This is not too unusual since although the series takes place in Australia, Luke O'Neill and Meggie's children were the only major characters who were Australian-born. Father Ralph, Mary Carson, and Paddy Cleary were all Irish-born. Fee and most of the Cleary children were born in New Zealand.
 During casting, actress Jane Seymour was considered for the role of Meggie Cleary and the role of Mary Carson was originally offered to Audrey Hepburn.
 Father Terrance Sweeney, an Emmy Award-winning Jesuit priest, was a technical advisor on the mini-series. He left the priesthood in 1986 and married Pamela Susan Shoop, an actress and daughter of actress Julie Bishop, in 1987. They co-authored the book "What God Hath Joined" that discussed their relationship. 
 Charles Swaim of Drakesville, Iowa, who was the world champion sheep shearer at the time, was the consultant for the sheep shearing scenes in the series.
 The serial has had great success in France. The French title is "Les oiseaux se cachent pour mourir" (The birds hide to die). The series is still regularly repeated on TV channels.
 The series was also very successful in Brazil, where it was broadcast by SBT. During its first broadcast, in 1985, the miniseries beat Globo TV network in the ratings, which had always been the leader in ratings in Brazil. The series last aired in Brazil from January 5 through March 9, 2019, at 6:30 PM (local time).

Awards and nominations

Home media
The Thorn Birds was released on VHS in 1991 in the US and Canada; it was re-released on DVD in the US and Canada on February 3, 2004. Both editions were given a "Not Rated" certification. It is rated PG in New Zealand for violence, sexual references, coarse language and nudity.

Sequel
A followup titled The Thorn Birds: The Missing Years was broadcast by CBS in 1996. It tells the story of the 19 years unaccounted for in the original miniseries.

References

External links
Encyclopedia of Television

1983 American television series debuts
1983 American television series endings
American Broadcasting Company original programming
1980s American television miniseries
Family saga television series
Films scored by Henry Mancini
Television shows based on Australian novels
Television series set in the 1920s
Television series set in the 1930s
Television series set in the 1940s
Television series set in the 1950s
Television series set in the 1960s
Television shows set in the Outback
Best Miniseries or Television Movie Golden Globe winners
Television series by The Wolper Organization
Films directed by Daryl Duke
Catholicism in fiction

ko:가시나무새들
hr:Ptice umiru pjevajući
sh:Ptice umiru pjevajući